The following is a timeline of major events during the Myanmar civil war (2021–present), following the 2021 military coup d'état and protests. It was also a renewed intensity in existing internal conflict in Myanmar.

2021

March
 25 March, the KIA seized the military base of Alaw Bum near the town of Laiza. As a response, on 11 April, the junta military launched a counter-attack to recapture the base using airstrikes and ground troops but had to retreat amidst heavy casualties.
 26 March, the Karen National Liberation Army (KNLA) attacked a military base, killing 10 soldiers and taking others hostages in the first attack on the military since the protests began.
 28 March- 
 Dozens of protesters travelled to Myanmar's border areas to enlist in and train under one of the country's many insurgent groups, elevating the risk of a countrywide civil war. 
 The first day of openly armed resistance against the coup where armed protesters in the town of Kalay fought back against soldiers and security forces attacking a protest camp, with clashes also taking place in villages in Kale township.
 30 March- 
The Committee Representing Pyidaungsu Hluttaw proposes the formation of a "federal armed force" to combat the military. The Kachin Independence Army (KIA) has already been on the offensive against the military since February, and in late March the Arakan Army (AA) threatened to end its ceasefire with the military should the latter "persist in massacring civilians".
Protesters increasingly begun arming themselves with homemade weapons such as guns in an attempt to defend themselves against attacks by the military. Simultaneously, clashes with soldiers and IED attacks against administrative buildings and police stations became more common as the trend of protesters using armed resistance rose.

April
 4 April- seven insurgent groups who were signatories to the Nationwide Ceasefire Agreement aligned themselves with the Committee Representing Pyidaungsu Hluttaw, including the All Burma Student Democratic Front and the Karen National Union.
 8 April- Taze becomes another frequent site of clashes when protesters fight back against soldiers with hunting rifles and firebombs in a battle that resulted in 11 protesters' deaths. The same day, the country surpassed 600 deaths related to anti-coup protests since 1 February.
 10 April- when the Northern Alliance, comprising the Arakan Army, the Ta'ang National Liberation Army and the Myanmar National Democratic Alliance Army, attacked a police station in Naungmon, Shan State, killing at least 10 police officers.
 16 April- pro-democracy politician Min Ko Naing announced the formation of the National Unity Government, with people of ethnic minority groups among senior roles and said that ousted leaders Aung San Suu Kyi and Win Myint would retain their positions and that members of the Kachin and Karen minorities would have top priority in the new parallel government. In the same announcement, Min Ko Naing asked the international community for recognition over the junta.
 26 April- the Chinland Defense Force began an armed resistance in Mindat, Chin State. As a response, the junta cut off food and water supplies and declared martial law. Fighting began when a group of demonstrators outside the town's Aung San statue requested the release of six of their arrested colleagues, when a soldier of the regime allegedly fired at someone, prompting protesters to react.

May
 5 May- the National Unity Government declared the formation of an armed wing, the People's Defence Force (PDF) to protect its supporters from military junta attacks and as a first step towards a Federal Union Army.
 23 May- The People's Defence Force clashed with the Tatmadaw in the town of Muse on 23 May, killing at least 13 members of Myanmar's security forces.
 26 May- 
 Six Tatmadaw soldiers were killed in an ambush by the Chinland Defense Force in Hakha, Chin State. * the same day, the Tatmadaw launched airstrikes in Kayin State in response to the Karen National Liberation Army's capture and scorching of a Tatmadaw military base.
 Members of the Karenni People's Defence Force (KPDF) in Kayah State also captured and destroyed several Tatmadaw outposts near the state capital of Loikaw.
 The second-in-command of the Shanni Nationalities Army, Major General Sao Khun Kyaw is assassinated by the Myanmar Army.
 29 and 30 May- the Tatmadaw used artillery and helicopters to strike PDF and KPDF positions in Loikaw and Demoso.
 30 May- the Kachin Independence Army joined the anti-coup People's Defence Force battling junta troops in Katha Township, killing eight regime soldiers. Fighting was also continuing in Putao, Hpakant and Momauk Township.

June

 1 to 3 June- fighting erupted in Myawaddy District in which the military and Karen Border Guard Force (BGF) battling against a combined force of Karen ethnic armed groups and PDF had left dozens of junta troops killed.
 5 June-
 Four villagers in Kyonpyaw Township, Ayeyarwady Region, are shot dead after locals confront junta troops with slingshots and homemade gas.
 3 resistance fighters die and 40 civilians are arrested after three bomb explosions in Hakha, the capital of Chin State
 Junta detain villagers in Putao Township and NLD party officials in Bhamo.
 6 June-
 Houses and a Catholic church in Dawngakar, Demoso Township are damaged by shelling.
 Mongpai houses are set on fire after junta troops loot local grocery stores.
 22 June- junta forces using armoured vehicles raided a safehouse of the PDF in Mandalay, detaining a number of fighters.
 30 June- junta releases 2,296 detainees, including journalists and protestors. Most detainees released were arrested due to the protests and more than 4,000 prisoners remain detained from protest arrests.

July

 2 July- media reported that Myanmar security forces killed at least 25 people in a confrontation with opponents of the military junta in the central town of Tabayin.
 19 to 30 July- Myanmar's healthcare system collapses at the onset of a new wave of COVID-19 cases as oxygen supplies run low. The junta restricts the private sale of oxygen tanks to prevent healthcare workers participating in civil disobedience from providing free care to other civilians. Protesting doctors are arrested by the junta after being lured out of hiding to treat "patients".

August

 1 August – Min Aung Hlaing extends state of emergency, saying it could last until August 2023 and named himself the new Prime Minister of Myanmar
 3 August – The United States charges two Myanmar citizens over an alleged plot to hire hitmen and assassinate Kyaw Moe Tun, Myanmar's representative to the United Nations who defied the military coup earlier in 2021. The junta denies involvement.
 11 August – Five people jump from a four-story building in Botahtaung Township, Yangon to escape raiding junta soldiers. The raid came after suspicions about a series of blasts in downtown Yangon.
 16 August – Wa National Party chairman resigns after pledging to cooperate with the military regime and welcoming the election announced by the junta.
 20 August- 50 junta soldiers were reportedly killed in a series of landmine attacks by resistance fighters in Gangaw Township.

September

 7 September- the NUG declared a state emergency across the nation and launched a people's defensive war against the military junta.
 10 September- at least 17 people have been killed during clashes between the military and resistance militia in Myin Thar village, Magway region.
 14 September- the National Unity Government claimed that over 1700 junta soldiers had been killed and 630 wounded in fighting during the previous three months.
 21 September- over 40 junta soldiers were reported killed during firefights in Kayah State and the Sagaing Region on 19 September. At least 6 civilian fighters were also killed in the clashes.
 22 September- it was reported that nearly 8,000 residents of Thantlang town, Chin state, fled to Mizoram, India after houses were set ablaze by the junta army.
 27 September- over 30 junta soldiers and at least 14 civilian resistance fighters were reported killed in clashes over the previous weekend in several townships in Sagaing Region and Chin and Kayah States.
 28 September- at least 20 junta soldiers were reported killed in ambushes in Shan state. At least 4 resistance fighters died in the clashes, along with an unarmed 70-year-old civilian.

October

 6 October- over 40 junta soldiers were killed in ambushes in Gangaw Township, Magwe Region.
 7 October- junta controlled media reported at least 406 junta informants had been killed and 285 wounded since 1 February in targeted attacks by resistance forces.  
 the same day, Brigadier-General Phyo Thant, a senior commander of the North-western junta forces was reportely detained after allegedly contacting resistance forces with the intention to defect, making him the highest-ranking official to have attempted to defect so far.
 11 October- around 90 junta soldiers were reported killed in clashes in the Sagaing and Magwe regions, and Kayah State in fighting over the previous weekend.

November

 16 November- junta forces overran and captured the base camp of Kalay PDF in a southwestern district of the Sagaing Region town of Kalay. A total of 9 Kalay PDF medics were captured and 2 PDF fighters were killed, in which the PDF personnel were from the Kalay PDF's Battalion 3.
 17 November- dozens of junta forces ambushed and captured an outpost of the Moebye People's Defence Force (PDF) in southern Shan State's Pekhon Township. The PDF fighters guarding the outpost were asleep when a military unit from Light Infantry Battalion (LIB) 422 carried out an ambush. The junta forces had the resistance fighters surrounded resulting in the resistance fighters having to retreat from the outpost.
 23 November- some 30 junta soldiers in 10 military vehicles along with a bulldozer, ambushed and destroyed a base belonging to Monywa PDF's Squadron 205 near Palin village in Monywa, Sagaing Region, forcing resistance fighters to flee. The base was also the site of a workshop where the PDF had made explosive devices. During the raid, junta troops set fire to two such buildings where weapons had been stockpiled. This also resulted in the junta forces successfully reoccurring the Palin village.
 25 November-
 Junta forces ambushed and killed 4 resistance fighters from KNDF near the village of Hohpeik in Kayah State's Demoso Township. The 4 resistance fighters were part of a scouting team of 6 men that was ambushed by troops from Light Infantry Battalion 427 at around 5:30 am.
 Furthermore, the Kachin Independence Army (KIA) clashed with around 100 junta soldiers near Kachinthay, a village about 16 km east of the town of Shwegu. KIA refused to address rumours of them working with People's Defence Force and did not provide casualty figures of KIA from the clash. The clash occurred after an aerial bombardment allegedly carried out by 2 of the recently acquired Su-30 fighter jets that the Myanmar military have been testing.
 Matupi CDF teamed up with the Chin National Army to attack an outpost of Light Infantry Battalion 304 on the road linking Matupi to the town of Paletwa. However, the resistance forces only managed to kill 2 junta soldiers on guard duty before having to retreat.
 26 November, resistance fighters from the Chinland Defence Force (CDF) attacked a government office where 10 soldiers were stationed near the Chin State town of Matupi, killing just 2 junta soldiers.
 28 November, the body of a dead PDF fighter who was previously captured by junta forces was found outside of a destroyed PDF base in the forested hills of the southeastern area of Madaya Township. The PDF fighter, Ye Thu Naing, was captured on 19 November and then forced to lead soldiers to the PDF base in which the soldiers then torched the base.

December

 1 December
 A little under a week after the junta launched airstrikes against the Kachin Independence Army (KIA) in Mohnyin, about 50 soldiers from Tatmadaw's Infantry Battalion 42 attacked KIA territory near Nyaung Htauk village in Mohnyin at around 8 am and ended at about 6 pm. KIA's information officer did not want to disclose the details of casualties on their side. There was also another clash on the same day near Wailon village, which sits along the road linking Hpakant with Mohnyin, about 17 miles from Hpakant's urban centre in which the junta's artillery unit fired around 30 shells at the site of the clash between 3 pm and 8 pm to support the advance of the infantry unit. 
The junta forces also carried out a night operation in which they captured and burned a camp of the Thein Min PDF (TM-PDF) after a heavy firefight. The resistance fighters were then forced to retreat, resulting in 2 TM-PDF fighters killed and several others injured.
 7 – 10 December Salingyi G-Z Local People's Defence Force (PDF) fighters were captured and burned by junta soldiers in Done Taw in Salingyi Township, shortly before locals found the smoldering remains of their burnt bodies. This was after the PDF fighters detonated explosives in an attack against a military convoy travelling nearby, triggering an assault on the village by some 100 junta soldiers. An additional person burned was a civilian and the reason is unknown as to why he was burned.
 8 December-  a 90-minute clash broke out between the CDF and Tatmadaw forces in military-occupied town of Thantlang. This was after Tatmadaw launched a major offensive against CDF that lead to the Tatmadaw forces being able to reoccupy the town from the CDF. 3 CDF fighters were reported to have died during the clash. More houses were burned in military-occupied Thantlang this week, with well over a quarter of the Chin State town's buildings now destroyed in 12 incidents, which makes it difficult for CDF rebels to hide in the buildings.
 9 December- resistance fighters from the Myaing People's Defence Force (PDF) in Magway Region attacked two military vehicles with 3 handmade explosives in an ambush in the early morning. PDF claimed the ambush injured at least 3 soldiers. Later at noon, PDF attacked soldiers again who were leaving the village in Mintharkya on foot, sparking a shootout between the two sides. However, there are no casualty reports on this particular clash.
 12 December- 
 After 4 days of fierce fighting between combined force of KNDF and Karenni Army (KA) fighters, and troops from the military's Light Infantry Battalion 428 and police, it was claimed by KNDF that 4 Tatmadaw soldiers were killed however, it was a pure guess as the KNDF spokesperson said, "We're not sure if they died, but it's safe to assume that at least three or four of their soldiers were severely injured". 
 The Tatmadaw forces also killed 4 PDF-appointed community guards and 3 PDF fighters as well as injuring 3 PDF fighters in the village of Guang Kwe in the Sagaing region during two days of fighting. The resistance fighters then had to retreat from the village after military employed heavy weapons and snipers.
 Tatmadaw troops killed 8 Mandalay civilian guerrilla groups when two resistance hideouts were raided. This came after the confession by a suspect involved in an attack against Tatmadaw troops, in which the Tatmadaw troops then raided the People's Defense Forces (PDF) in Maha Aung Myay and Pyigyitagon townships. Fighting occurred at the Maha Aung Myay base and seven PDF members were killed and a junta soldier suffered a minor bullet wound in his stomach while another PDF fighter was killed in Pyigyitagon base after throwing a homemade bomb at junta forces and running away.
 13 December-
 Tatmadaw troops launched an offensive against PDF fighters as well as another local resistance group calling itself Zayar 7 in Ke Bar village in Sagaing Region's Ayadaw Township which is assisted by artillery bombardment. The resistance fighters had to retreat due to the superior firepower of the assaulting Tatmadaw troops.
 Tatmadaw soldiers captured 12 suspected resistance fighters including 3 injured fighters after several bombs exploded by accident in Yangon's Hlaing Tharyar Township. 2 additional resistance fighters who escaped were also captured later on by plain clothed and armed Tatmadaw troops who were wearing bulletproof vests. There have been several other cases of guerrilla fighters across Myanmar dying in accidents caused by handmade explosives.
 Depayin PDF leader reported that Tatmadaw forces have surrounded the Sagaing's Depayin Township where PDF fighters are positioned. Depayin PDF leader also told Myanmar NOW, "Things are really bad here. They're not even stopping anymore. They keep sending column after column to the region. Right after a column has passed the village, another column will come". Since last month the military has sent around 150 soldiers of the Airborne Division in six helicopters to the west of Depayin to carry out Air Assault missions.
 14 December- Around 200 Tatmadaw soldiers conducted a search in the town of Lay Kay Kaw Myothit, located near the Thai border which is under the control of KNU Brigade 6. Tatmadaw troops then arrested several people believed to be linked to anti-junta movements including a NLD lawmaker, Wai Lin Aung. The Tatmadaw troops, who arrived in four convoys from Light Infantry Battalion 560, also searched Lay Kay Kaw's residential Nyein Chan Yay ward looking for activists and members of the People's Defence Force. KNU Brigade 6 spokesperson did not answer to calls which are to ask if the group had authorised the raid.
 17 December
 20 resistance fighters from Yaw Defence Force were killed after the Tatmadaw launched a surprise air assault on the village of Hnan Khar in Magway Region's Gangaw Township where YDF was holding a meeting. Three helicopters were involved in the air assault on the village. Hnan Khar is currently occupied by around 150 junta soldiers and members of the military-backed Pyusawhti militia, said one resident of the village. 
Furthermore, a member of a local armed resistance group was shot dead and three others were captured during a military raid in Yangon Region's Thanlyin Township. The raid, which targeted a house located near the village of Laharyet, was carried out at around 9am. A 30-year-old member of the group died after being shot in the chest and thigh and two men and one woman were captured. The body of the dead resistance fighter, who was identified on a Thanlyin-based Facebook page as Phyo Maung Maung Oo, was taken away by the soldiers.
 20 December- Tatmadaw forces left the village of Kunnar in Kayah (Karenni) State's Loikaw Township after capturing it from KNDF late last week. According to the KNDF member, there were around 130 troops stationed in Kunnar over the weekend. He added that there had been no new clashes since fighting broke out twice last week, on Monday and Thursday.
 22 December- At least nine people, including two children, were killed after an air raid by the Myanmar Air Force in Gangaw Township. As many as five helicopters fired on the village of about 6,000 people.
 24 December- more than 35 people were massacred when their convoy were ambushed by junta troops near Mo So village of Hpruso town, Kayah State. Two workers for non-profit group Save the Children remained missing after the attack. The United Nations have called for a 'thorough and transparent investigation' into the incident.

2022

January
 7 January – Intense fighting breaks out in Loikaw, the Kayah State Capital between KNDF and junta troops as resistance groups attempt to take the city after one month of blocking junta road access to the entire state.
 10 January- Myanmar military begins bombing Loikaw from the air forcing thousands of locals to flee the city and seek shelter in churches. Junta helicopters regain control of roads to other parts of Kayah State.
 13 January- Maung Maung Kyaw is removed as the head of the Myanmar Air Force after international attention and sanctions from a series of aerial bombings. He remains on the junta.
 17 January – Junta airstrikes an IDP camp in Kayah State sheltering civilians fleeing intensified fighting in southeastern Myanmar.
 31 January, at least three dozen junta soldiers were reported killed in ambushes over three days in Magwe, Sagaing and Tanintharyi regions and Chin, Shan and Kayah states.

February
 1 February- it was reported at least 30 junta soldiers and allied militiamen from the Pyusawhti militias had been killed by joint PDF attacks in Kani Township, Sagaing Region. Flotillas transporting supplies and soldiers by the junta were ambushed, with at least one flotilla set on fire during the attacks.
 2 February-
 2 people were killed and 38 injured in a grenade attack following a pro junta rally.
According to Senior General Min Aung Hlaing, 367 junta-appointed officials have been assassinated in targeted attacks since 2021's 1 February coup.
 4 February – Junta troops carries out a sneak attack on an Arakan Army outpost near Maungdaw in Rakhine State
 6 February – A three-hour clash between Arakan Army and the Junta starts a breakdown of the informal ceasefire between the AA and the military in place since November 2020.
 7 February- it was reported that 38 junta soldiers had been killed in surprise attacks by local PDFs in the Sagaing Region. These attacks also included the use of drones. The Kachin Independence Army also claimed that around 200 junta soldiers, including a battalion commander, had been killed in three days of clashes in the Hpakant Township, Kachin State.
 8 February- it was reported that the Arakan Army and junta forces had clashed on at least two occasions in Maungdaw in Rakhine State. Fighting broke out on 4 February when junta troops carried out a sneak attack on an AA outpost near the Letpan Mountains northeast of Mee Taik Village, killing an AA sentry, according to AA spokesman Khaing Thukha. Three hours of clashes were also reported on 6 February. The clashes have raised fears of a breakdown of the informal ceasefire between the AA and the military which has been in place since November 2020. Two civilians were also reported killed in further clashes in northern Maungdaw on the night of 7 February.
 9 February- it was reported that 35 junta soldiers had been killed in attacks by local PDFs in the Sagaing and Bago regions the previous day. Resistance forces also began targeting the homes of junta pilots in Yangon in response to airstrikes on civilians.
 10 February- around 50 Myanmar junta personnel were reportedly killed during raids and ambushes by people's defense forces in three townships in Sagaing Region on 9 February.
 11 February- several junta troops, including a Major, were reported killed in an attack by the Arakan Army in Maungdaw, Rakhine State, on 8 February. 38 junta soldiers and 5 resistance fighters were also reported killed in clashes in Sagaing Region and Kayah State on 10 and 11 February.
 14 February- it was reported 40 junta troops had been killed in attacks by PDF forces on 12 and 13 February. The clashes occurred in the Naypyitaw, Magwe, Sagaing, Mandalay and Yangon regions.
17 February- resistance fighters were also reported killed in clashes in the Khin-U Township, Sagaing Region while military casualties from those clashes were not reported.

 18 February- around 20 junta soldiers and 20 resistance fighters were reportedly killed in clashes in Mobye town, southern Shan State.

March
 March – the junta carries out repeated air bombing and looting of villages in Shan and Kayah State, attacking civilians, in what Amnesty International later accuses the junta of Collective Punishment
 7 March- around 85 junta soldiers were reportedly killed during two clashes with local PDFs and Karenni forces in Demoso Township, Kayah State, during the previous weekend, with at least two junta soldiers captured.
 21 March
 Brigade 6 of the Karen National Liberation Army (KNLA) stormed and occupied a Tatmadaw camp in the village of Maw Khi in Wallay Myaing subtownship, Myawaddy District, Kayin State in the evening. The Maw Khi camp is located about 50 miles south of Myawaddy, about three miles from the Burmese-Thai border. Eight Tatmadaw soldiers were killed according to Khit Thit Media.
 8 junta soldiers were reported killed in mine attacks by local resistance forces in the Magwe region.
 28 March- Min Aung Hlaing vowed to "annihilate" opposition forces.
 30 March- around 20 junta soldiers were reported killed in ambushes targeting junta convoys in Mindat township, Chin state.

April 
 14 April- Fighting broke out in parts of Loikaw City on 14 April. Recent combat in Kayin state resulted in a marked increase in refugees on the Thai border.
 15 April- junta soldiers suffered at least 30 casualties after being pushed back by the KNLA at the battle for Lay Kay Kaw.
 19 April- 30 junta soldiers were reported killed in two ambushes by local resistance forces in Pale Township, Sagaing Region.
 21 April- two junta officers and 24 men working for the military council's electricity department were arrested by KNDF forces in southern Shan State's Pekhon Township. * the same day, a local defence force based in Tanintharyi Region's Kawthaung District claimed that they managed to kill three Myanmar army soldiers, confiscate weapons and occupy a police station in the area.
 27 April- Chinland Defense Force fighters from Matupi reportedly ambushed a 70 vehicle Tatmadaw column between Matupi and Kyauktaw, resulting in the deaths of 8 junta soldiers.

May

 17 May- National Unity Government Defence Minister Yee Mon asks international help to arm resistance groups similar to support given to Ukraine.
 31 May- a bombing kills one person and injures nine others near the Sule Pagoda in Yangon, Myanmar. State media accuses the People's Defence Force of responsibility, which the PDF denies.

June 
 12 June – Almost 90 junta troops are reportedly killed in fierce fighting in Chin State, Kachin State and northern Sagaing Region. Shootouts lasting several hours between military battalion 415 and combined Kachin State PDF and KIA forces near Shwegu Township and Mohnyin Township, Kachin State. Chin Defense Force (CDF) claim to have killed 16 regime soldiers in Kanpetlet Township, Chin State. 
 16 – 18 Juneta troops are killed by PDF ambush attacks in Yesagyo Township, Magway Region and Budalin Township, Sagaing Region. The attacks are claimed to be responses to the junta's arson attacks on 14 June.
 23 June- 50 civilians are detained as hostages after a nighttime raid by the junta in Khin-U Township.

July
 6 July- the Karen National Union stated that roughly 2,200 junta soldiers and militiamen had been killed since January 2022. Around 40 junta soldiers and 11 PDF fighters were also reported killed in clashes in Pekon township, Shan state.
 23 July- the State Administration Council announced that it had executed four political prisoners, including Zayar Thaw and Kyaw Min Yu, marking the first time the death penalty had been carried out in Myanmar since the late 1980s. The event was widely seen as provocative escalation by the Burmese military in the ongoing conflict. The international community, including United Nations Secretary-General, the G7 nations, Canada, France, Germany, Italy, Japan, the United Kingdom, and the United States of America, and the European Union strongly condemned the executions.

August 
 11 August – At least 80 regime forces, including three battalion commanders and captains, are killed in firefights with PDF and EAOs across the country.
 12 August - The Shanni Nationalities Army (SNA) and the Myanmar Army set fire to hundreds of homes in Hpakant Township, Kachin state forcing KIA withdrawal from the area.
 15 August- the military junta court sentences former state counsellor Aung San Suu Kyi to six years in prison for corruption.
 16 August- two mortar shells fired from Myanmar Army lands in a Rohingya refugee camp in Bangladesh, killing one man and injuring five others. Myanmar Army helicopters allegedly entered Bangladeshi air space to attack Arakan Army and reportedly fired a shell within Bangladeshi air space. Two days later, Bangladesh summons Myanmar ambassador Aung Kyaw Moe to protest violation of land and airspace strongly.

September 

 2 September-
 Aung San Suu Kyi is sentenced to three years in prison after being found guilty of election fraud. She will now serve an overall sentence of 20 years in prison for different charges.
 Two SNA bases are attacked by the KIA and allied People's Defence Force groups using heavy artillery in Banmauk Township and Homalin Township.
 16 September- The Burmese military killed 11 children and wounded another 17, during an airborne strike at a school in Letyetkone village, Sagaing Region (see Let Yet Kone massacre). The military claimed that the village had been harboring resistance fighters from the Kachin Independence Army and the People's Defense Force. The attack was widely condemned by the international community, including the United Nations and European Union.
 23 September- retired Brigardier General Ohn Thwin, mentor to State Administration Council vice-chairman Senior General Soe Win, is assassinated by anti-regime guerilla groups in Yangon. This assassination increases security on high-ranking junta personnel as the highest ranked Myanmar army member to have been killed so far.

October 

 8 October- Junta forces torch at least 20 villages in Sagaing and Magway regions in implement its "four cuts" strategy of attacking civilian houses to weaken anti-regime movements. However, according to Sagaing-based resistance spokespeople, people who lose everything in these torchings joined the resistance
 Mid-October- NUG releases a statement calling for the victory of the Spring Revolution by the end of 2023. This call to action is followed by increased fighting in urban areas and in Southeastern Myanmr with resistance forces.
 21 October
 Junta forces decapitate Saw Tun Moe, a high school teacher, and leave leave his head impaled on the a NUG-administered school's spiked gate after burning and looting Taung Myint village in Magway Region
 Bangladesh's Foreign Minister AK Abdul Momen makes a statement that border bombings by Myanmar stopped after he met Chinese ambassador to Bangladesh Li Jiming.
KNLA-led troops begin sieging Kawkareik. A series of morning attacks near the highway leading into the city and on government offices leads to heavy fighting within the city.
 22 October- In the evening, KNLA-led troops retreat from Kawkareik after what appeared to be the first seizure of a major city. Fighting in the area continues.
 23 October- over 80 people were killed by an airstrike in Hpakant Township, Northern Myanmar during a celebration for the 62nd founding anniversary of the Kachin Independence Organization. It becomes the single deadliest attack on civilians (hence the term Hpakant massacre) since the start of the renewed civil war. The Junta denied there being civilian casualties while the United Nations condemned the attack. Reportedly among the dead was a singer and keyboard player performing at the event.
 27 October- Karen National Liberation Army-led forces seized the junta base for Light Infantry Battalion 339 in Kya Inn Seikgyi Township, Karen State.

November 

 13 November - One of the Myanmar Air Force's Mi-34 helicopter mistakenly fires on junta troops, killing 60 in friendly fire.
 14 November - Junta fines local administrators who fled their village in Pauk Township, Magway Region after fearing forced recruitment into the military-backed Pyusawhti militia earlier in November. Pyusawhti militias also looted the homes of those that fled.
 15 November - The junta shells villages in Rakhine State on the highway between Yangon and Sittwe after a junta truck was hit by an Arakan Army landmine. Thousands of villagers flee to nearby Ponnagyun Township or Sittwe.
 16–22 November - Chin state resistance forces used drones in a week-long siege of an outpost in Falam Township, killing 74% of the junta forces stationed. The Chin National Defence Force was ultimately were unable to take the outpost due to the Air Force's aerial bombardments.
 19 November - Hundreds of homes and many civilians are killed in a series of raids on Sagaing resistance stronghold of Khin-U Township 
 21–25 November - The Myanmar Air Force bombs several KIA targets in Mohnyin Township, Banmauk Township and Katha Township along the Sagaing-Kachin border to disrupt supply lines. Analysts say the junta is increasingly relying on its air force due to low ground capacity.
 22 November 
 The junta burns down a police station they could no longer defend in Myaing Township.
 PDF attacks a police building in Monyo Township, Bago Region using cluster bombs.
 24 November - The junta burns Mone-Hla village in Khin-U Township, Sagaing Region including the home of Cardinal Charles Maung Bo, the head of the Catholic Church in Myanmar.
 26 November - 15 Junta soldiers are killed on a Bago PDF raid on a police station in Yedashe Township, Bago Region
 27 November - Arakan Army and the junta enter a temporary ceasefire either as a first step towards a more permanent ceasefire or for humanitarian reasons.
 30 November - Junta begins a major assault on a Kokang base held by the Myanmar National Democratic Alliance Army near Chin Shwe Haw.2

December 

 6 December - Karenni Nationalities Defence Force soldiers capture three junta officers and a soldier responsible for the Mo So massacre in 2021.
 7 December - Myanmar army launches a ground offensive against the Ta'ang National Liberation Army (TNLA) in Namhsan Township starting the Battle of Namhsan.
 13 December - Myanmar army utilises aerial bombs in clashes with the TNLA in the Battle of Namhsan.
 16 December - The BURMA Act is passed in the US authorising sanctions on individuals involved in the 2021 Myanmar coup d'état, support to civil society and humanitarian assistance as well as a position within the State Department dedicated to democracy in Burma.
 17 December - Junta retreats from the Battle of Namhsan after suffering 98 casaulties and issues a statement claiming the attack was a misunderstanding and that they reached an agreement with the TNLA. The TNLA rejects the statement.
 27 December - Junta soldiers hide in civilian trucks impersonating workers to ambush local defence forces in Shwebo Township.
 29 December - Several high-ranking former government officials of Ayeyarwady Region are released from house arrest including former chief minister Hla Moe Aung
 30 December - Aung San Suu Kyi is sentenced to 33 years in prison for corruption.

2023

January 

 5 January - Clashes between PDF forces near Inle Lake and the Pa-O National Organisation (PNO) broke out after the PNO attempted to force villages in the area to each provide a speedboat and a Pyusawhti militia recruit.
 31 January - The junta-run Ministry of Home Affairs issues a directive permitting citizens deemed "loyal to the state" to obtain firearm licences and permits.

February 

 7 February - The National Defence and Security Council extends the country's state of emergency and the military junta's term by an additional six months.
 23 February - Martial law is extended to 3 additional townships in Sagaing Region. The Myanmar Army's 99th Light Infantry Division (LID) launches a new offensive against villages in Sagaing Region to suppress the anti-military resistance.
 26 February - After a fight with local resistance forces in the village of Kandaw, four village fighters, including two teenagers, are decapitated.

March 

 2 March - 99th LID troops execute 17 villagers during the Tar Taing massacre in Sagaing Region, including two men who are decapitated, and three women who are raped before they are killed.
 11 March - Army troops execute at least 30 villagers during the Pinlaung massacre in Shan State, including 3 Buddhist monks

References 

2021 in Myanmar
2022 in Myanmar
Insurgencies in Asia
Internal conflict in Myanmar
21st-century revolutions